Ion is a masculine given name. The written form corresponds to two names that are different and unrelated in origin.

The first is the Greek name  (Iōn), after the mythical founder of the Ionians; the modern (demotic) Greek equivalent is Ionas.

The second name is the Romanian Ion which is equivalent to the English name John and has the same etymology as "Jon", all tracing back to the Hebrew Bible name Johanan.  Another variant is Ioan, the Romanian name for John the Baptist (Ioan Botezătorul). Common diminutives are Ionel and Ionuț. Its female form is Ioana. The surname Ionescu is derived from Ion. However, Ion can also be a surname in Romanian.

Ion as a given name 
 Ion of Chios (c. 490/480–c. 420 BC), Greek writer, dramatist, lyric poet and philosopher
 Ion Agârbiceanu (1882–1963), Romanian writer and priest
 Ion Andreescu (1850–1882), Romanian painter
 Ion Antonescu (1882–1946), Romanian soldier, authoritarian politician and convicted war criminal
 Ion Barbu (disambiguation)
 Ion C. Brătianu (1821–1891), Romanian statesman
 Ion I. C. Brătianu (1864–1927), Romanian politician, five-term Prime Minister of Romania, son of Ion C. Brătianu
 Ion Budai-Deleanu (1760–1820), Romanian scholar, philologist, historian, and poet
 Ion Călugăru (1902–1956), Romanian novelist, short story writer, journalist and critic
 Ion Luca Caragiale (1852–1912), Wallachian-born Romanian playwright, short story writer, poet, theater manager, political commentator and journalist
 Ion Caramitru (born 1942), Romanian actor, stage director and politician
 Ion Codreanu (1891–1960), Romanian general in World War II
 Ion Constantinescu (1896–?), Romanian general in World War II
 Ion Creangă (1837 or 1839–1889), Moldavian, later Romanian writer, raconteur and schoolteacher
 Ion Dolănescu (1944–2009), Romanian singer and politician
 Ion Dragalina (1860–1916), Romanian First World War general
 Ion Dragoumis (1878–1920), Greek diplomat, philosopher, writer and revolutionary
 Ion Druță (born 1928), Moldovan writer
 Ion G. Duca (1879–1933), assassinated Prime Minister of Romania
 Ion Farris (1878–1934), American politician and attorney
 Ion Foti (1887–1946), Romanian poet
 Ion Emanuel Florescu (1819–1893), Romanian general, twice briefly Prime Minister of Romania
 Ion Ghica (1816–1897), Romanian revolutionary, mathematician, diplomat and politician, five-time prime minister of Romania
 Ion Gigurtu (1886–1959), Romanian politician, officer, engineer and industrialist, briefly Prime Minister of Romania
 Ion Hamilton, 1st Baron HolmPatrick (1839–1898), Anglo-Irish Member of Parliament
 Ion Llewellyn Idriess (1890–1979), a prolific and influential Australian author
 Ion Iliescu (born 1930), twice president of Romania
 Ion Inculeț (1884–1940), Bessarabian politician and President of the Moldavian Democratic Republic
 Ion Ionescu de la Brad (1818–1891), born Ion Isăcescu, Moldavian, later Romanian revolutionary, agronomist, statistician, scholar and writer
 Ion Ionuț Luțu (born 1975), Romanian footballer
 Ion Izagirre (born 1989), Spanish professional cyclist
 Ion Jalea (1887–1983), Romanian sculptor
 I. C. Massim (1825–1877), linguist and a founding member of the Romanian Academy
 Ion Gheorghe Maurer (1902–2000), Romanian communist politician and lawyer
 Ion Mihalache (1882–1963), Romanian agrarian politician
 Ion Mincu (1852–1912), Romanian architect, engineer, professor and politician
 Ion Minulescu (1881–1944), Romanian avant-garde poet, writer, journalist, literary critic and playwright
 Ion Miu (born 1955), Romanian musician
 Ion Moța (1902—1937), Romanian nationalist, deputy leader of the Iron Guard
 Ion Negoițescu (1921–1993), Romanian literary historian, critic, poet, novelist and memoirist
 Ion Nistor (1876–1962), Romanian historian and politician
 Ion Ion (footballer) (born 1954), Romanian former footballer
 Ion Mihai Pacepa (born 1928), Romanian security police three-star general who defected to the United States
 Ion Perdicaris (1840–1925), Greek-American playboy who was the centre of a notable kidnapping known as the Perdicaris incident
 Ion Heliade Rădulescu (1802–1872), Wallachian, later Romanian academic, Romantic and Classicist poet, writer, newspaper editor and politician
 Ion A. Rădulescu-Pogoneanu (1870–1945), Romanian pedagogue
 I. M. Rașcu (1890–1971), Romanian poet, cultural promoter, comparatist and schoolteacher
 Ion Roată (1806–1882), Moldavian, later Romanian peasant and politician
 Ion Sân-Giorgiu (1893–1950), Romanian poet, dramatist, essayist, literary and art critic, journalist, academic and politician
 Ion Dezideriu Sîrbu (1919–1989), Romanian philosopher, novelist, essayist and dramatist
 Ion Șiugariu (1914–1945), Romanian poet
 Ion Tănăsescu (chemist) (1892–1959)
 Ion Tănăsescu (surgeon) (1875–1954)
 Ion Testemițanu (born 1974), Moldovan former footballer and current assistant manager of the Moldovan national football team
 Ion Ţiriac (born 1939), Romanian businessman and former tennis player
 Ion Trewin (1943 – 2015), British editor and author
 Ion Țuculescu (1910–1962), Romanian painter
 Ion Țurai (1907–1970), Romanian surgeon
 Ion Voinescu (1929–2018), Romanian football goalkeeper

Ion as a surname 
 Barry Ion (born 1941), Australian rules footballer and radio personality
 Corneliu Ion (born 1951), Romanian sports shooter and 1980 Olympic champion
 Ion Ion (footballer) (born 1954), Romanian former footballer
 Patrick Ion (born 1942),  American mathematician
 Sue Ion (born 1955), British engineer, advisor on the nuclear power industry

See also 
 Ioan (name)
 Ionel (name)
 Ionuț (name)
 Ionești (disambiguation)
 Ionășeni (disambiguation)

Ion
Romanian-language surnames